This is a complete list of regulatory reform orders made in the United Kingdom between 2001 and 2013, totalling 55 items. Regulatory reform orders are laws made under the framework of delegated legislation in the United Kingdom, a form of secondary legislation, under powers granted by the Regulatory Reform Act 2001.

The listing is ordered by year, and then by reference number.

(LA) = Link added, This is a generated link during the last update, if you use this link and it works, please remove the (LA) notation from that line.

SI = statutory instrument

Orders
SI 2001/3937 The Regulatory Reform (Special Occasions Licensing) Order 2001 (LA)
SI 2002/906 The Regulatory Reform (Voluntary Aided Schools Liabilities and Funding) (England) Order 2002 (LA)
SI 2002/1062 The Regulatory Reform (Golden Jubilee Licensing) Order 2002 (LA)
SI 2002/1457 The Regulatory Reform (Carer’s Allowance) Order 2002 (LA)
SI 2002/1592 The Regulatory Reform (Vaccine Damage Payments Act 1979) Order 2002 (LA)
SI 2002/1860 The Regulatory Reform (Housing Assistance) (England and Wales) Order 2002 (LA)
SI 2002/3203 The Regulatory Reform (Removal of 20 Member Limit in Partnerships etc.) Order 2002 (LA)
SI 2002/3205 The Regulatory Reform (Special Occasions Licensing) Order 2002 (LA)
SI 2003/256 The Regulatory Reform (Credit Unions) Order 2003 (LA)
SI 2003/259 The Regulatory Reform (Assured Periodic Tenancies) (Rent Increases) Order 2003 (LA)
SI 2003/940 The Regulatory Reform (Housing Management Agreements) Order 2003 (LA)
SI 2003/986 The Regulatory Reform (Schemes under Section 129 of the Housing Act 1988) (England) Order 2003 (LA)
SI 2003/1281 The Regulatory Reform (Sugar Beet Research and Education) Order 2003 (LA)
SI 2003/1545 The Regulatory Reform (British Waterways Board) Order 2003 (LA)
SI 2003/3096 The Regulatory Reform (Business Tenancies) (England and Wales) Order 2003 (LA)
SI 2003/3275 The Regulatory Reform (Gaming Machines) Order 2003 (LA)
SI 2004/470 The Regulatory Reform (Sunday Trading) Order 2004 (LA)
SI 2004/1939 The Regulatory Reform (Museum of London) (Location of Premises) Order 2004 (LA)
SI 2004/2357 The Regulatory Reform (Patents) Order 2004 (LA)
SI 2004/2359 The Regulatory Reform (Local Commissioner for Wales) Order 2004 (LA)
SI 2005/55 The Regulatory Reform (Unsolicited Goods and Services Act 1971) (Directory Entries and Demands for Payment) Order 2005 (LA)
SI 2005/634 The Regulatory Reform (Joint Nature Conservation Committee) Order 2005 (LA)
SI 2005/871 The Regulatory Reform (Trading Stamps) Order 2005 (LA)
SI 2005/908 The Regulatory Reform (Prison Officers) (Industrial Action) Order 2005 (LA)
SI 2005/1074 The Regulatory Reform (National Health Service Charitable and Non-Charitable Trust Accounts and Audit) Order 2005 (LA)
SI 2005/1541 The Regulatory Reform (Fire Safety) Order 2005
SI 2005/1906 The Regulatory Reform (Execution of Deeds and Documents) Order 2005 (LA)
SI 2006/484 The Regulatory Reform (Fire Safety) Subordinate Provisions Order 2006 (LA)
SI 2006/780 The Regulatory Reform (Forestry) Order 2006 (LA)
SI 2006/1974 The Regulatory Reform (Registered Designs) Order 2006 (LA)
SI 2006/2805 The Regulatory Reform (Agricultural Tenancies) (England and Wales) Order 2006 (LA)
SI 2006/3251 The Care Standards Act 2000 and the Children Act 1989 (Regulatory Reform and Complaints) (Wales) Regulations 2006 (LA)
SI 2007/1889 The Regulatory Reform (Collaboration etc. between Ombudsmen) Order 2007 (LA)
SI 2007/1973 The Regulatory Reform (Financial Services and Markets Act 2000) Order 2007 (LA)
SI 2007/2007 The Regulatory Reform (Game) Order 2007 (LA)
SI 2007/2183 The Regulatory Reform (Deer) (England and Wales) Order 2007 (LA)
SI 2007/3224 The Secretaries of State for Children, Schools and Families, for Innovation, Universities and Skills and for Business, Enterprise and Regulatory Reform Order 2007 (LA)
SI 2007/3544 The Legislative and Regulatory Reform (Regulatory Functions) Order 2007 (LA)
SI 2007/3548 The Legislative and Regulatory Reform Code of Practice (Appointed Day) Order 2007 (LA)
SI 2009/2981 The Legislative and Regulatory Reform (Regulatory Functions) (Amendment) Order 2009 (LA)
SI 2010/3028 The Legislative and Regulatory Reform (Regulatory Functions) (Amendment) Order 2010 (LA)
SI 2013/1455 The Enterprise and Regulatory Reform Act 2013 (Commencement No. 1, Transitional Provisions and Savings) Order 2013 (LA)
SI 2013/1648 The Enterprise and Regulatory Reform Act 2013 (Commencement No. 2) Order 2013 (LA)
SI 2013/1666 The Enterprise and Regulatory Reform Act 2013 (Health and Safety) (Consequential Amendments) Order 2013 (LA)
SI 2013/1854 The Enterprise and Regulatory Reform Act 2013 (Broadcasting Consequential Amendments) Order 2013 (LA)
SI 2013/1956 The Enterprise and Regulatory Reform Act 2013 (Consequential Amendments) (Employment) Order 2013 (LA)
SI 2013/2146 The Enterprise and Regulatory Reform Act 2013 (Abolition of Conservation Area Consent) (Consequential and Saving Provisions) (England) Order 2013 (LA)
SI 2013/2227 The Enterprise and Regulatory Reform Act 2013 (Commencement No. 3, Transitional Provisions and Savings) Order 2013 (LA)
SI 2013/2268 The Enterprise and Regulatory Reform Act 2013 (Competition and Markets Authority) (Consequential Amendments) Order 2013 (LA)
SI 2013/2271 The Enterprise and Regulatory Reform Act 2013 (Commencement No. 1, Transitional Provisions and Savings) (Amendment) Order 2013 (LA)
SI 2013/2880 The Enterprise and Regulatory Reform (Designation of the UK Green Investment Bank) Order 2013 (LA)
SI 2013/2979 The Enterprise and Regulatory Reform Act 2013 (Commencement No. 4 and Saving Provision) Order 2013 (LA)

Other legislation
Legislative and Regulatory Reform Act 2006
Enterprise and Regulatory Reform Act 2013

References

United Kingdom law-related lists
Reform in the United Kingdom